The 1957 Nebraska Cornhuskers football team was the representative of the University of Nebraska and member of the Big 7 Conference in the 1957 NCAA University Division football season. The team was coached by Bill Jennings and played their home games at Memorial Stadium in Lincoln, Nebraska.

Before the season
New head coach Jennings had only been on the Nebraska football staff for one year, as backfield coach, before ascending to the top spot.  With three new assistants on staff, he faced a very difficult 1957 schedule.  A home opener against Washington State would be followed by three straight road games, one of which was against longtime nemesis Pittsburgh.  Upon the return to Lincoln there would be one more nonconference game against always-tough Syracuse, the first meeting of these teams since 1929.  Now in its 16th year, the long stretch of Nebraska futility would be difficult to halt against this slate.

Schedule

Roster

Coaching staff

Game summaries

Washington State

These teams had only met one time prior, a 21-20 defeat of the Cornhuskers in Lincoln in 1920.  The Cougars brought with them a reputation as an outstanding passing offense, and true to form used their game plan to roll up points by air faster than Nebraska could respond by ground.  The Bill Jennings era opened with a loss.

Army

In the first meeting of these teams, the Black Knights of West Point utterly obliterated the Cornhuskers in front of a relatively small Michie Stadium crowd.  No matter which way they turned, by air or ground, all of Nebraska's attempts to at least avoid the shutout were thwarted.  Army went on to finish the season ranked #18 by the AP Poll.

Kansas State

The Cornhuskers traveled to Manhattan for the first Big 7 contest of the season, again in front of a sparse crowd.  While the Cornhuskers managed only two touchdowns on the day, the hapless Wildcats were unable to move the ball enough to score more than once.  Nebraska had notched the first win of the year and improved to 32-7-2 in the Kansas State series to date, but there was little time to celebrate.  The difficult road trip to Pittsburgh, now ranked #20 by the AP Poll, was next up.

Pittsburgh

For the second time of the season, Nebraska was dealt a punishing road game shutout defeat, this time at the hands of bitter rival Pittsburgh.  The Panthers, who nearly always seemed to have Nebraska's number, improved to 15-3-3 over the Cornhuskers all time with their sixth straight win in the series.  Nebraska had now stumbled out to a 1-3 start thanks in part to the grueling schedule, and the situation was not looking like it would improve.

Syracuse

Renewing an old series last updated in 1929, the Orangemen arrived in Lincoln as Nebraska's final nonconference foe of the year.  Unfortunately for the struggling Cornhuskers, the slide continued as Syracuse handled the Big Red's efforts with relative ease.  With the win, Syracuse also evened up the all-time series between the programs at 4-4-0.

Missouri

Returning to the Big 7 schedule, the downtrodden Cornhuskers traveled to Columbia to face Missouri, and to defend their custody of the Victory Bell.  The tone of the season seemed to be set, however, and Nebraska's three-game winning streak against the Tigers was broken by a painful single-point 13-14 loss.  Though the Cornhuskers still held a daunting series lead of 28-19-3, the Bell was handed over to the Tigers.

Kansas

Nebraska's hopes to put up a win for the homecoming crowd in Lincoln were dashed when Kansas arrived and dealt a two-point loss to the Cornhuskers, snapping Nebraska's five-game winning streak over the Jayhawks.  The Cornhuskers still held a commanding 46-14-3 series edge, but were now just 1-6 on the season.

Iowa State

If there was hope for a victory to break the slide, it would have most likely been placed against the Cyclones, over which the Cornhuskers had run off 11 straight wins.  Iowa State was well aware of Nebraska's skid, and were not intimidated by the visitors from Lincoln.  Not only did the Cyclones snap their losing streak, they also dealt the season's third shutout defeat to the Cornhuskers in front of a surprisingly sparse crowd.  This loss was Nebraska's fifth in a row, tying an all-time losing streak record set in 1941 and tied in 1945.  The Cornhuskers still held a 41-9-1 lead in the series, but this loss was perhaps the lowest point of a very low season.

Colorado

Nebraska had just one more game with any hope of a victory before facing the defending league champion Sooners.  Even with home field advantage, however, the Cornhuskers fell again and were handed the year's fourth shutout loss, at the hands of the Buffaloes.  Colorado's win narrowed the series to 9-7-0, and set a new Nebraska all-time record of six consecutive losses.

Oklahoma

Any fight that might have been left in Nebraska, as they marched onto the field at Memorial Stadium with only a 1-8 record to show for their work, was quickly expended shortly after the season-ending rivalry with Oklahoma was underway.  The Sooners were in fact prevented from scoring in the first quarter, a noteworthy accomplishment when considering the opponent, but Nebraska soon folded under the onslaught and ended the 1957 campaign with another loss, the 15th in a row to Oklahoma.  Nebraska's all-time losing streak record was extended to seven with the defeat, as the Sooners took over the series at 17-16-3.  Oklahoma went on to finish the season ranked #4 by the AP Poll.

After the season
It was known going in that Coach Jennings' first year was going to be a tough season, but that did not soften the sting of a 1-9 final record, the most losses in a single season and the worst overall season record in program history.  The only other prior year that the Cornhusker football squad had only pulled down a single win was 1899's 1-7-1 campaign.  Nebraska's overall program record tumbled to 352-198-34 (.009), the seventh straight year to see a drop in winning percentage, as the Big 7 history also slipped, to 147-63-12 (.689).

Future professional players
 Clarence Cook, 1957 18th-round pick of the Los Angeles Rams

References

Nebraska
Nebraska Cornhuskers football seasons
Nebraska Cornhuskers football